Mikhaylovka is a rural locality (a selo) in Leninsky Selsoviet of Arkharinsky District, Amur Oblast, Russia. The population was 10 as of 2018. There are 3 streets.

Geography 
Mikhaylovka is located 40 km southwest of Arkhara (the district's administrative centre) by road. Leninskoye is the nearest rural locality.

References 

Rural localities in Arkharinsky District